Rolland Torok (born October 25, 1990) is a Romanian basketball player for CSO Voluntari of the Liga Națională and the Romanian national team. He participated at the EuroBasket 2017.

Awards and accomplishments
U BT Cluj-Napoca
Liga Națională: (2017)
2× Romanian Cup: (2016, 2017)
Voluntari
 Romanian Cup: (2022)

References

1990 births
Living people
BC Körmend players
CS Universitatea Cluj-Napoca (men's basketball) players
CSU Sibiu players
Romanian people of Hungarian descent
Jászberényi KSE players
Power forwards (basketball)
Romanian expatriate basketball people in Hungary
Romanian men's basketball players
Sportspeople from Oradea
CSO Voluntari players